Ace Attorney is a series of legal thriller comedy-drama adventure/visual novel games created by Shu Takumi. Players assume the role of a defense attorney in a fictional courtroom setting in the main series. Published by Capcom, the series includes Phoenix Wright: Ace Attorney, Phoenix Wright: Ace Attorney – Justice for All, Phoenix Wright: Ace Attorney – Trials and Tribulations, Apollo Justice: Ace Attorney, Ace Attorney Investigations: Miles Edgeworth, Ace Attorney Investigations 2, Phoenix Wright: Ace Attorney – Dual Destinies, The Great Ace Attorney: Adventures, Phoenix Wright: Ace Attorney – Spirit of Justice, and The Great Ace Attorney 2: Resolve. Character names for the English release of the series were changed significantly from the original Japanese release.

Main characters

Phoenix Wright

 is a defense attorney and the main character of the franchise, and the protagonist in all games in the main series, except for Apollo Justice. Maya Fey, the sister of Mia Fey, also lends a hand. He frequently appears dressed in a blue suit, a white shirt, and a red tie.

Mia Fey

Miles Edgeworth

 is Phoenix Wright's long-time friend and first rival in the court room. He is temporarily playable in Phoenix Wright: Ace Attorney – Trials and Tribulations and the main player character in Ace Attorney Investigations: Miles Edgeworth and Ace Attorney Investigations 2. As a child, Edgeworth aspired to become a defense attorney, following in his father Gregory Edgeworth's footsteps. When they were children, Edgeworth successfully defended Phoenix in a classroom trial, where Phoenix was accused of stealing lunch money from Edgeworth himself. However, upon witnessing his father's death and watching in horror as the suspected murderer was let free, he gained a hatred for criminals and began studying to be a prosecutor, learning tactics from his mentor Manfred von Karma to always get a "guilty" verdict. This later earned him the name "demon prosecutor". Miles had not lost a case he was involved with until his first trial against Phoenix, after which he felt a need to defeat Phoenix.

Edgeworth's spin-off game Ace Attorney Investigations was originally going to star Ema Skye, another character from the series, but due to fan response, they went with Miles Edgeworth, a more popular character.

Maya Fey

 is a spirit medium and the younger sister of Phoenix's boss, Mia Fey. Maya is introduced in Phoenix Wright: Ace Attorney, in which she is accused of her sister's murder and defended by Phoenix. She becomes his legal assistant and investigates cases with him in the first three Ace Attorney games. Maya cheerily banters with Phoenix during investigations, and can channel her sister's spirit when Phoenix needs her help. She does not appear in the fourth and fifth games, but returns in the sixth, reuniting with Phoenix in Khura'in as she prepares to complete her channeling training. Maya also appears in other franchise media: the manga, film, anime series, and the spin-off games including the Professor Layton crossover and Ace Attorney Investigations. Maya, alongside Phoenix, also makes cameo appearances in several games across other genres.

Pearl Fey

Dick Gumshoe
Portrayed by: Shunsuke Daito (film)Voiced by (English): Bryan Massey

Franziska von Karma
Voiced by (English): Janet Hsu (AA2-AA3, AAI); Jessica Peterson (anime)Voiced by (Japanese): Yukari Suwabe (AA2-AA3, AAI-AAI2);

Ema Skye
Voiced by (English): Erica LindbeckVoiced by (Japanese): Marina Inoue
 is the younger sister of Chief Prosecutor  and has hopes of becoming a scientific investigator. She first approaches Phoenix's office to obtain a defense attorney for her sister, Lana. Though he ignored most of the cases he received during Maya's two-month absence, he took Ema's due to her resemblance to Maya in personality and appearance. The kanji for her Japanese surname, Hōzuki, translates to "treasured moon" or "jeweled moon". She was included in the video game Apollo Justice: Ace Attorney due to the developers' desire to bring back some familiar faces to it, where she became a homicide detective after failing to qualify for her dream job. As a result, she became moodier and addicted to a chocolate treat called "Snackoos." In Spirit of Justice, she finally passed the test to become a forensic investigator and lightens up. Ace Attorney Investigations: Miles Edgeworth was originally to star Ema Skye, but due to the response from the fanbase, they chose to replace her with Miles Edgeworth, who was a much more popular character. She was featured as a secondary character in it.

Nintendo World Report editor Michael Cole commented that Apollo Justice: Ace Attorneys witnesses are not quite as funny or interesting as the ones in the Phoenix Wright story arc, specifically mentioning Ema Skye, adding that she lacks Dick Gumshoe's "lovable incompetence".

The Judge
Portrayed by: Akira Emoto (film)Voiced by (English): Dave Mallow (UMvC3) Dave B. Mitchell (AA5), Kent Williams (anime)Voiced by (Japanese): Kanehira Yamamoto (UMvC3); Bunmei Tobayama (AA5); Ben Hiura (anime)

The unnamed

Apollo Justice
Voiced by (English): Orion Acaba (AA5-AA6)Voiced by (Japanese): Kotaro Ogiwara (AA4); Kenn (AA5-AA6)

Trucy Wright
Voiced by (English): Kira BucklandVoiced by (Japanese): Chieko Higuchi
, born

Athena Cykes
Voiced by (English): Wendee LeeVoiced by (Japanese): Megumi Han

Ryunosuke Naruhodo
Voiced by (English): Mark OtaVoiced by (Japanese): Hiro Shimono

Susato Mikotoba
Voiced by (English): Rina TakasakiVoiced by (Japanese): Kana Hanazawa
 is a judicial assistant who often helps Ryunosuke in his cases. She is described by Capcom as a yamato nadeshiko (a personification of the image of the ideal Japanese woman), a progressive dreamer, and a lover of foreign mystery novels.

Herlock Sholmes
Voiced by (English): Bradley ClarksonVoiced by (Japanese): Shinji Kawada

Iris Wilson

Voiced by (English): Claire MorganVoiced by (Japanese): Misaki Kuno

Barok van Zieks
Voiced by (English): Robert VernonVoiced by (Japanese): Kenjiro Tsuda

Kazuma Asogi
Voiced by (English): Ben DeeryVoiced by (Japanese): Yūichi Nakamura

Others

Recurring characters

Frank Sahwit
Voiced by (English): Ben PhillipsVoiced by (Japanese): Shinya Takahashi

Misty Fey
Voiced by (English): Terri DotyVoiced by (Japanese): Kaori Nakamura

Morgan Fey
Voiced by (English): Stephanie YoungVoiced by (Japanese): Shukuko Tsugawa

Winston Payne
Portrayed by: Seminosuke Murasugi (film)Voiced by (English): David Crislip (AA1-AA4); Gregory Lush (anime)Voiced by (Japanese): Wataru Hama (AA1-AA4); Wataru Yokojima (anime)

Larry Butz
Voiced by (English): Josh Martin (anime)Voiced by (Japanese): Masaya Onosaka (AA6); Tōru Nara (anime)

Manfred von Karma

Portrayed by: Ryo Ishibashi (film)Voiced by (English): Bill JenkinsVoiced by (Japanese): Akio Ōtsuka

Wendy Oldbag
Voiced by (English): Anastasia MuñozVoiced by (Japanese): Yu Sugimoto

Will Powers
Voiced by (English): Chris RagerVoiced by (Japanese): Shota Yamamoto

Lotta Hart
Portrayed by: Mitsuki Tanimura (film)Voiced by (English): Whitney RodgersVoiced by (Japanese): Reiko Takagi

Maggey Byrde
Voiced by (English): Dawn M. BennettVoiced by (Japanese): Yoshiko Ikuta

Shelly de Killer
Voiced by (English): Marcus StimacVoiced by (Japanese): Wataru Yokojima
The third in a line of professional hitmen,

Adrian Andrews
Voiced by (English): Mallorie RodakVoiced by (Japanese): Ayaka Asai

Marvin Grossberg
Voiced by (English): Phil ParsonsVoiced by (Japanese): Ryo Sugisaki

Klavier Gavin
Voiced by (English): Andrew Alfonso (AA4); Yuri Lowenthal (AA5)
Voiced by (Japanese): Ryoji Yamamoto (AA4); Toshiyuki Kusuda (AA5)

Simon Blackquill
Voiced by (English): Troy BakerVoiced by (Japanese): Shunsuke Sakuya

Gregory Edgeworth
Portrayed by: Takehiro Hira (film)Voiced by (English): Anthony BowlingVoiced by (Japanese): Kyunosuke Watanuki

Director Hotti

Kay Faraday

Shi-Long Lang

Tyrell Badd

Phoenix Wright: Ace Attorney

April May
Voiced by (English): Jeannie TiradoVoiced by (Japanese): Mariko Honda

Redd White
Portrayed by: Makoto Ayukawa (film)Voiced by (English): Larry BrantleyVoiced by (Japanese): Hiromichi Tezuka

Sal Manella
Voiced by (English): Tyler Walker
Voiced by (Japanese): Masato Nishino

Dee Vasquez
Portrayed by: Miho Ninagawa (film)Voiced by (English): Janelle LutzVoiced by (Japanese): Yurika Hino

Robert Hammond
Voiced by (English): Blake Shepard

Yanni Yogi
Portrayed by: Fumiyo Kohinata (film)Voiced by (English): R. Bruce ElliottVoiced by (Japanese): Takehiro Hasu

Damon Gant

Lana Skye 
 In the Japanese musical based on the series, Ace Attorney – Truth Resurrected, staged by the all-female troupe Takarazuka Revue, Asahi Miwa was cast as Leona Clyde, an original character based on Lana, whom Phoenix Wright is featured as having once been in a romantic relationship with in place of Iris/Dahlia Hawthorne. The sequel, Ace Attorney 2 – Truth Resurrected, Again, establishes Leona to have died shortly after the first musical, and he mourns her death.

Jake Marshall

Angel Starr

Mike Meekins

Justice for All

Richard Wellington
Voiced by (English): Ricco FajardoVoiced by (Japanese): Daisuke Kishio

Ini Miney
Voiced by (English): Mikaela KrantzVoiced by (Japanese): Natsue Sasamoto

Acro
Voiced by (English): Clifford ChapinVoiced by (Japanese): Takayuki Nakatsukasa
, known under the stage name

Regina Berry
Voiced by (English): Jad SaxtonVoiced by (Japanese): Yō Taichi

Moe
Voiced by (English): Sonny StraitVoiced by (Japanese): Takeshi Uchida

Matt Engarde
Voiced by (English): Dave TroskoVoiced by (Japanese): Yasuaki Takumi

Trials and Tribulations

Prosecutor Godot
Voiced by (English): James C. Wilson (AA3); Brandon Potter (anime)Voiced by (Japanese): Hideki Kamiya (AA3); Hiroaki Hirata (anime)
, real name

Ron DeLite
Voiced by (English): Justin Pate
Voiced by (Japanese): Kōtarō Nishiyama

Desirée DeLite
Voiced by (English): Jamie Marchi
Voiced by (Japanese): Yuka Keichō

Dahlia Hawthorne
Voiced by (English): Dani Chambers
Voiced by (Japanese): Rina Satō

Luke Atmey
Voiced by (English): Ian Sinclair
Voiced by (Japanese): Toshihiko Seki

Jean Armstrong
Voiced by (English): J. Michael Tatum
Voiced by (Japanese): Fukushi Ochiai

Victor Kudo
Voiced by (English): Greg Dulcie
Voiced by (Japanese): Jin Urayama

Furio Tigre
Voiced by (English): Sam Riegel
Voiced by (Japanese): Satoshi Mikami

Viola Cadaverini
Voiced by (English): Madeleine Morris
Voiced by (Japanese): Saori Hayami

Iris
Voiced by (English): Dani Chambers
Voiced by (Japanese): Rina Satō

Apollo Justice: Ace Attorney

Kristoph Gavin
Voiced by (English): Andrew Alfonso
Voiced by (Japanese): Ryoji Yamamoto

Alita Tiala

Daryan Crescend

Vera Misham

Magnifi Gramarye

Thalassa Gramarye

Zak Gramarye

Valant Gramarye

Spark Brushel

Dual Destinies

Gaspen Payne
Voiced by: Hisashi Izumi
 is Winston Payne's younger brother who appears as the first prosecutor in Phoenix Wright: Ace Attorney - Dual Destinies. He is a bit more flexible with the law than his brother and is not averse to using dirty tricks in the courtroom; his attitude is rather conceited towards defense attorneys as well. He wears a black suit with sunglasses and has a large quiff hairdo.

Juniper Woods
Voiced by: Eri Ozeki

Bobby Fulbright
Voiced by: Biichi Sato

Ted Tonate

Florent L'Belle

Aristotle Means

Aura Blackquill

Marlon Rimes

Spirit of Justice

Ahlbi Ur'gaid
Voiced by: Emiri Katō

Nahyuta Sahdmadhi 
Voiced by: Daisuke Namikawa

Rayfa Padma Khura'in
Voiced by: Saori Hayami

Inga Karkhuul Khura'in
, full name

Dhurke Sahdmadhi
Voiced by: Masashi Ebara

Datz Are'bal

Ga'ran Sigatar Khura'in
Voiced by: Gara Takashima

Jove Justice

Amara Sigatar Khura'in

Pees'lubn Andistan'dhin

Roger Retinz

Tahrust Inmee

Geiru Toneido

Paul Atishon

Pierce Nichody

Ace Attorney Investigations series

Calisto Yew
Voiced by: Yuki Nakamura

Quercus Alba

"Teikun Ō"

Tateyuki Shigaraki

Ryōken Hōinbō

Hakari Mikagami

Yumihiko Ichiyanagi
Voiced by: Kotaro Ogiwara

Bansai Ichiyanagi

Sota Sarushiro

The Great Ace Attorney series

Yujin Mikotoba

Taketsuchi Auchi

Seishiro Jigoku

Mael Stronghart

Tobias Gregson

Gina Lestrade

Klint van Zieks

References

 
Fictional defense attorneys
Fictional lawyers
Lists of anime and manga characters
Lists of Capcom characters